5 Days of War is a 2011 action film directed by Renny Harlin. The story is about the Russo-Georgian War over the Russian-backed breakaway autonomous republic of South Ossetia in Georgia, including the events leading up to the conflict.

The film was released in Georgia as 5 Days of August, and in other countries as 5 Days of War and also City on Fire.

Plot
In 2007, during the Iraq War, a Georgian contingent of the coalition forces saves the life of American reporter Thomas Anders (Rupert Friend), although one of his colleagues (Heather Graham) is killed in the process. One year later, in 2008, he returns to Los Angeles, California but soon goes to Georgia on the advice of some of his friends in Tbilisi, who suspect that a large conflict is brewing. He, along with his cameraman Sebastian Ganz (Richard Coyle), delve deeper into Georgian life as conflict escalates and they get caught in the crossfire when an air raid strikes a local wedding they stumble upon. With members of the wedding party (Emmanuelle Chriqui), and the help of a Georgian soldier (Johnathon Schaech) who had earlier saved them in Iraq, their mission becomes getting their footage of an atrocity by Russian irregulars out of the country. But they find themselves faced with international apathy due to the opening of the 2008 Olympic Games. Their flight leads them to the Gori.

The film ends with a long series of testimonials from Georgian citizens who lost family members during the conflict.

Cast
 Rupert Friend as Thomas Anders, an American reporter
 Emmanuelle Chriqui as Tatia, a young Georgian woman
 Richard Coyle as Sebastian Ganz, an English reporter
 Heather Graham as Miriam, an American reporter in Iraq
 Johnathon Schaech as Rezo Avaliani, a young Georgian officer
 Rade Serbedzija as Col. Alexandr Demidov
 Andy García as Mikheil Saakashvili, the President of Georgia
 Val Kilmer as "Dutchman", a journalist
 Mikko Nousiainen as Daniil
 Mikheil Gomiashvili as Anton Medoev, father of Tatia
 Ani Imnadze as Sofi Medoev
 Antje Traue as Zoe, an American reporter
 Kenneth Cranham as Michael Stilton, an English war reporter
 Dean Cain as Chris Bailot, secretary of Saakashvili
 Sergo Shvedkov as Temur Iakobashvili, Georgian Minister of Reintegration
 Steven Robertson as Davit Kezerashvili, Georgian Defense Minister
 Alan McKenna as Alexander Lomaia, Georgian Representative to the U.N.
 Malkhaz Abuladze as Mayor of Tbilisi, Giorgi Ugulava
 Marshall Manesh as Lech Kaczyński, President of Poland, Chairman of the delegation leaders of the former Eastern bloc
 Givi Sikharulidze as Valdas Adamkus, President of Lithuania
 Zura Tsintsqiladze as Valdis Zatlers, President of Latvia

Production
Filming started in October 2009, in Tbilisi. Filming took 36 days with a budget of 12 million dollars.

According to Georgian President Mikheil Saakashvili, the film was not financed by the Georgian government; however one of the producers, David Imedashvili, said that the initial funding for the project came from a Georgian government fund. According to Georgian media the movie was financed by Koba Nakopia, a parliamentarian from the ruling United National Movement party of Saakashvili. Also credited as producer are director Renny Harlin, George Lascu and Mirza Davitaia, who served as Georgian State Minister for "diaspora issues" from 2009 to 2012, who at the time of filming was the Georgian Deputy Minister, Ministry of Culture, Monument Protection and Sports.

One of the buildings of the Georgian Presidential administration was used for filming parts of 5 Days of War. Some members of the special effects team were Russian and had previously worked on Night Watch. The military equipment and personnel used in the film were lent by the Georgian army.

Release
 The film first premiered in Tbilisi, Georgia on June 5, 2011 and was attended by the participating actors, as well as actress Sharon Stone, who helped raise approximately $1 million during the subsequent fundraiser for the victims of the Russo-Georgian war.
 London, England, June 9, 2011
 Georgia, June 6, 2011
 United States, August 19, 2011
 Poland, April 27, 2012

Reception
On review aggregator Rotten Tomatoes, the film holds an approval rating of 34% based on 35 reviews, with an average rating of 4.44/10. On Metacritic, the film has a weighted average score of 31 out of 100, based on 14 critics, indicating "generally unfavorable reviews". Both Bloomberg and The Washington Post gave it a one-star rating.

5 Days of War opened in limited release in the United States on August 19, 2011 in two theatres in New York City and Washington D.C. It grossed $6,254 in its opening weekend.

Home media
5 Days of War was released on DVD (Region 2) and Blu-ray (Region B) on June 13, 2011. The DVD is a one-disc set. The Blu-ray is a one-disc set that includes DTS-HD 5.1 sound, as well as subtitles, in English, German and French.

References

Further reading 
Fedorov, Alexander. The Analysis of Stereotypes of Politically Engaged Media Texts in Media Studies in Student Audience (by the Example of Renny Harlin’s films "Born American" (1986) and "Five Days of War" (2011)

External links
 
 
 
 
 
 

2011 films
2010s English-language films
2010s Georgian-language films
American action war films
American action drama films
2011 action drama films
2010s war films
Films about war correspondents
Films set in Georgia (country)
Films set in 2008
Russo-Georgian War films
Films directed by Renny Harlin
Films scored by Trevor Rabin
2010s American films